Cryptolechia orthrarcha is a moth in the family Depressariidae. It was described by Edward Meyrick in 1930. It is found in Algeria.

The wingspan is about 24 mm. The forewings are whitish, with a faint ochre-pinkish tinge. The second discal stigma is small, indistinct and grey. The hindwings are white.

References

Moths described in 1930
Cryptolechia (moth)
Taxa named by Edward Meyrick